Shalla-Bal is a fictional character appearing in American comic books published by Marvel Comics.

Publication history

The character first appeared in Silver Surfer #1 (August 1968).

Fictional character biography
Shalla-Bal is the Empress of her utopian planet, Zenn-La (in the Deneb System, Milky Way Galaxy), and was the lover of Norrin Radd. When the planet-eating Galactus came to their planet, Norrin Radd volunteered to become the herald of Galactus in exchange for sparing Zenn-La. Norrin Radd was given the Power Cosmic and became the Silver Surfer, thus separating him from Shalla-Bal for a long time.

Eventually, the Surfer rebelled against Galactus, who trapped him on the planet Earth as a punishment. The demon Mephisto who desires to defeat the Surfer and steal his noble soul, sensed the anguish of this separation within him, and used Shalla-Bal as a pawn in his conflict with the Surfer. As part of a conspiracy Mephisto replaced the consciousness of Shalla-Bal so that she believed herself to be a regular citizen of Latveria named Helena, and Doctor Doom organized a false marriage celebration with her in order to make the Surfer fight the Fantastic Four.

Meanwhile, Galactus consumed the life energies and ecosphere of Zenn-La because of Silver Surfer's betrayal, but spared the lives of its people by warning them of his coming beforehand, allowing them to return to the lifeless husk afterwards. When Mister Fantastic freed the Surfer from his imprisonment, he returned to Zenn-La to find it in this state and learned that Shalla-Bal had been abducted by Mephisto. Finally understanding the conspiracy Surfer returned to Latveria to find Shalla-Bal meanwhile imprisoning himself once again on the Earth.  The Surfer bestowed a portion of his Power Cosmic to Shalla-Bal while Mephisto was sending her back to her planet, and she was able to use this power to restore the life on Zenn-La. She was thus accepted as an Empress by her people. However the responsibilities of her office made Shalla-Bal refuse marriage with the Surfer when he eventually broke free from Earth for good, and he told her that their romance was over. However, she was then held hostage by the Elders, but was rescued by the Silver Surfer.

Shalla-Bal later met the Kree leader, Nenora. Shalla asked the Surfer to protect Zenn-La from the Obliterator. Shalla made an alliance with the Skrull Empress S'byll against the Kree Empire. She was informed by the Cotati that Nenora was actually a disguised Skrull. Shalla was captured by Nenora's Kree Sentry, but freed by the Cotati. She told S'byll and the Surfer about Nenora's true nature, and was returned to Zenn-La by the Surfer.

Shalla was later taken captive by the Enslavers, and was then reunited with the Surfer. Shalla was seen in flashback telling Norrin Radd about his father's suicide. She was seen in flashback again at her first meeting with Norrin Radd when they were children. Shalla-Bal was later abducted with the planet Zenn-La by the Great One. Shalla was briefly reunited with the Silver Surfer, but disintegrated along with the Great One's pocket universe. The Surfer later returned her to life after her soul had been imprisoned by Mephisto.

After years of rejection, Shalla-Bal once became romantically involved with Fennan Radd, a man who claimed to be the Silver Surfer's half-brother by his father. Fennan claimed to have been born after Norrin's mother Elmar committed suicide.

Powers and abilities
As a member of the race of aliens known as Zenn-Lavians, Shalla-Bal has an extraordinarily long life span. Hence, Shalla-Bal has lived for centuries although she is still physically a young woman.

Shalla-Bal was once able to restore life to Zenn-La's ecosphere due to a fragment of the Silver Surfer's power cosmic that he placed within her. Apparently she can still cause plant life to grow wherever she walks.

Shalla-Bal is accomplished in administering government.

In other media

Television
 Shalla-Bal appeared in the Silver Surfer TV series voiced by Camilla Scott.

Film
 Shalla-Bal is alluded to in the 2007 movie Fantastic Four: Rise of the Silver Surfer, albeit not by name. It is here implied that she bears a resemblance to Susan Storm (played by Jessica Alba).

Music
Guitarist Joe Satriani recorded an instrumental rock song named "Back to Shalla-Bal" on his 1989 album Flying in a Blue Dream. Satriani's 1987 album, Surfing with the Alien, features the Silver Surfer and Galactus on the front and back of the album's artwork, respectively.
Australian rock group Swoop recorded a song named "Shalla Bal (Ballad(e) Of The Silver Surfer)" on their 1995 album The Woxo Principle.

References

External links
Shalla-Bal at Marvel Wiki

Characters created by Stan Lee
Comics characters introduced in 1968
Fictional emperors and empresses
Marvel Comics aliens
Silver Surfer